Nathan Phillips is the name of:

Nathan Phillips (politician) (1892–1976), Canadian politician
Nathan Phillips Square, the plaza in front of Toronto, Ontario's City Hall named in honour of the above
Nathan Phillips (actor) (born 1980), Australian actor
Nathan Phillips (activist), Native American political activist and member of the Omaha people

See also
Nat Phillips (born 1997), English footballer with Liverpool F.C.